"Stay Beautiful" is the second single from The Last Goodnight's album Poison Kiss (2007).

Track listings
Australian CD single
"Stay Beautiful" – 3:14
"Now That You're Gone" – 3:41
"Stay Beautiful" (Video)

Australian digital release
"Stay Beautiful" – 3:14
"Now That You're Gone" – 3:40

Charts

Release history

References

2007 songs
2008 singles
The Last Goodnight songs
Virgin Records singles
Song articles with missing songwriters